Partidong Pagbabago ng Palawan (PPPL) is a local political party in Palawan.

In the 2019 elections, the party forged an alliance with Hugpong ng Pagbabago and garnered most of the local positions in the province which includes its three congressional seats, governor, vice governor and members of the Palawan Provincial Board.

References

Local political parties in the Philippines
Politics of Palawan
Regionalist parties
Regionalist parties in the Philippines